Bouclair Inc. is a Canadian privately owned company and a lifestyle brand that offers home fashion and decor products including  furniture, window coverings, bedding, lighting, home accents, wall decor and seasonal products through its own retail stores across Canada and online.  The company is headquartered in Pointe-Claire, Quebec and operates 55 Bouclair stores across Quebec, Ontario, Western Canada, and Atlantic Canada. 

The company offers shopping in stores, online or through its call centre. In November 2019, Alston Investments Inc., a new company that includes Goldberg as a shareholder, announced it has offered to acquire Bouclair to streamline and modernize the chain, including expanding its experiential retail store concept and investing in e-commerce.

History
Founded as a fabric and sewing business in 1970, Bouclair has evolved into a lifestyle brand that offers affordable coordinated fashionable decor for every room in the home. The company currently operates under the leadership of its president, Peter Goldberg, who acquired the company in 2003 after leading a Management Buy-out.

Expansion 
In the late 1990s, the company opened numerous stores in Ontario and became a popular name amongst homeowners during this time. Since 2010, it has also expanded its presence in the rest of Canada, opening points of sale in Nova Scotia, New Brunswick, Newfoundland, Manitoba, Alberta, Saskatchewan and British Columbia. In the spring of 2006, Bouclair launched a new store concept called Bouclair Home (Bouclair Maison in French) diversifying its product offering to include fashionable home decor and furniture.

In 2012, Bouclair opened a wholesale division, marking the beginning of its international expansion, selling coordinated home collections in Europe, Asia and Oceania

Following the launch of its e-commerce site in March 2014, Bouclair also introduced its first complete line of furniture, with Atelier Bouclair – a higher-end collection of 21 design themes – sold online, orders in-store, through its call centre and by catalogue.

In November 2021, Bouclair opened its flagship store in Montreal's trendy Griffintown neighbourhood. Through a partnership with LNDMRK, Bouclair created Galerie B, a stage for emerging artists to share their art with the community and inspire Montreal to discover new artistic horizons while recognizing its Quebec roots. The brand also joined forces with award-winning Rodeo FX for the interactive work displayed on the street, the first and most significant digital billboard in Montreal.  

Currently, the company has 55 stores, including 23 new store concepts, open in Canada in Alberta, Manitoba, Quebec, Ontario, and New Brunswick, with 1029 employees across the headquarter and stores. Bouclair stores have become a community hub where customers can find decor inspiration, enjoy the shopping experience and transform their homes.

Products 
Bouclair sells window coverings, bedding, lighting, wall decor, home accents, greenery, rugs, kids' furnishings and baby decor. The products are created by its team of in-house designers and presented as coordinated collections in its retail outlets.

Recognition
La Presse recognized Bouclair in 2012 as a company to watch. In 2015, Bouclair ranked 223 amongst Top 500 Largest Companies in Quebec, Canada.

References

External links

Furniture retailers of Canada
1970 establishments in Canada
Retail companies established in 1970
Online retailers of Canada
Home decor retailers
Companies based in Quebec